Dawood Ali Mirza (23 December 1907—21 August 1986) was an Indian politician who was Member of the Rajya Sabha from Tamil Nadu. He was elected on 11 December 1956 and was Member till 2 April 1962. He was Member of the Indian National Congress.     

Dawood Ali Mirza was from Najm-i-Sani dynasty.   

He was the successor of Nawab Jaafar Ali Khan Bahadur, his paternal cousin and Brother in law.

Early life and education 

Mirza was born on 23 December 1907 in then Masulipatnam in Madras Province to Nawab Raza Ali Khan Bahadur brother of Nawab of Masulipatnam Nawab Husain Ali Khan Bahadur.

He has completed Bachelor of Arts.

Mirza was married to Rukaiya Dawood Mirza.

References 

1907 births
1986 deaths
Rajya Sabha members from Tamil Nadu
Indian National Congress politicians from Tamil Nadu